Aniceto del Carmen Esquivel Sáenz (April 18, 1824 – October 22, 1898) was President of Costa Rica for a brief period of three months in 1876 before being deposed in a coup d'état.

He was born on April 18, 1824 in Cartago (Costa Rica). He was baptized with the name of Aniceto del Carmen. His parents were Narciso Esquivel y Salazar and Úrsula Sáenz Ulloa. He contracted nuptials in San José, Costa Rica, on February 29, 1856, with Ana Isaura Carazo Peralta, daughter of Manuel José Carazo Bonilla and María Toribia Peralta and Echavarría. Thirteen children were born of this marriage: Julia, Jorge Adolfo, Matilde Adela (Sister María Caridad de Sion), Roberto, Paulina, Sara, Alfredo, Adriana, Isaura, Aniceto and Rosa Esquivel Carazo.

References

1824 births
1898 deaths
People from Cartago Province
Costa Rican people of Spanish descent
Presidents of Costa Rica
Vice presidents of Costa Rica
Foreign ministers of Costa Rica
History articles needing translation from Spanish Wikipedia
19th-century Costa Rican lawyers
Universidad de San Carlos de Guatemala alumni
Costa Rican liberals